Alberto Giorgetti (born 8 September 1967 in Verona) is an Italian politician.

A former member of the Italian Social Movement, in 1995 he joined National Alliance. Four times elected to the Chamber of Deputies (1996, 2001, 2006 and 2006), he has been regional leader of National Alliance since 2001. Since May 2008 he is Under-Secretary of Economy and Finances in Berlusconi IV Cabinet.

He is the younger brother of Massimo Giorgetti, who is regional minister since 1995.

References

Politicians of Veneto
Living people
1967 births
National Alliance (Italy) politicians